Raset Agiliaevich Ziatdinov is an Uzbek-American chess grandmaster.

Chess career
Ziatdinov won the Uzbekistan Individual Championship in 1983 and 1985, also playing for the Uzbek SSR at the Soviet Team Championships in both years. He was awarded the grandmaster title in 2005.

In May 2022, Ziatdinov was defeated in an upset by 10-year-old Sathvik Adiga in the 13th KIIT International Chess Festival.

Personal life
Ziatdinov resides in Irvington, New York.

References

Living people
1958 births
Uzbekistani chess players
American chess players
Chess grandmasters